GoatMan: How I Took a Holiday from Being Human is a 2016 book by Thomas Thwaites. It was published by Princeton Architectural Press. It describes a project in which the author attempted to live as a goat in the Swiss mountains for several days, with prosthetic limbs and an artificial stomach.

The book includes photographs of the author dressed as a goat at various locations.

Reception
New Statesman called it an "original, engaging and rather quirky book."

Kirkus Reviews called it "A quirkily entertaining exploration of what it means to be human and what it might be like to be a goat."

References

2016 non-fiction books
Books about Switzerland